The Mecca, formerly Young Mecca, is a St. Lucian hip hop/pop/EDM artist and songwriter. Growing up on the island of St. Lucia, he was one of the brave to defy norms and to move towards a more urban musical art form despite the dominance of other genres like soca and calypso. Part of his early popularity arose from his performances at stage shows opening for regional and international acts.

Early life and career beginnings

The Mecca was born Keen Cotter on July 22, 1983. He grew up in the southern fishing village of Laborie, St. Lucia and while in secondary school, Mecca began to pursue a music career. He started off by performing dancehall tracks by Red Rat and then moved on to hip hop tracks by Puff Daddy, Mase and Biggie Smalls. He was invited to perform alongside toasting champion Dj Grinch and this led to a healthy songwriting relationship for a few years. The Mecca's first original single and release was "Punk Daddy" in 1998.

2001-2010

Teaming up with fellow Laborian artist Shepp Dawg, the duo formed Rhymaz Inc and released two mixtapes within six months - Riddim Rydez Vol. 1 & 2. These mixtapes allowed for The Mecca and Shepp to open for Elephant Man, Wayne Marshall, Kiprich and Assassin.

2003 to 2006 were the true initiation years for Mecca. Under the Rhymaz Inc umbrella he executive produced three mixtapes; Mixtape 1 (2004), Mixtape 2 (2005), White Smoke (2006), all of which featured Rhymaz Inc counterpart Shepp Dawg, Dj Grinch, Dj Kapish and production from Sherwinn "Dupes" Brice. In 2004 Mecca saw his first hits with "In Da South" which featured his first ever music video and "Don't Cry," a tribute to Jany Williams - calypso queen, who died that same year. Both tracks were produced by Dupes and featured Shepp Dawg.

In 2005 Rhymaz Inc. had another hit song in "Yes Garcon" performed by Shepp Dawg and co-written by The Mecca. "Impossible" was released in 2006 and was seated at number 1 on local charts for twelve consecutive weeks. This hip hop - zouk fusion featured Dupes and production from French producer Dj Lams.

The Mecca's first solo effort, Catch Me If You Can, came in 2007. This 17 track record featured Dupes, Shepp Dawg and Texas based rappers Hoodhefna and Ill-Tactics with "Stay Fresh" being the radio single.

Rhymaz Inc was then rebranded in 2008 under the banner Presidential Media. Under this new brand Mecca and Shepp released yet another collaboration mixtape - Certified Royalty. Riding off this mixtape's success Mecca went on to release "Never Enough" and "Hello (What It Do)" in 2009. Later that same year he was crowned Youthstar 2009 after winning the inaugural Youthfest Competition.

Over the years The Mecca has produced and co-written albums, mixtapes, singles and compilations for other artists in genres ranging from Gospel to Hip-Hop, Dancehall to Soca, Pop and Rock. When 2010 came around he was nominated for five Underground Music Awards in Bermuda taking home the People's Choice Award.

2011-2013: Mecca Mondays 
On May 2, 2011 The Mecca embarked on a weekly endeavour to release one new single every Monday for a total of 52 weeks, and on April 23, 2012 St. Lucian music history was made. Not only did he accomplish his goal of successfully releasing a weekly song but he surpassed this with a total of 73 songs released within a one year period. Dupes played a big part in the whole Mecca Mondays feat being the producer behind majority of the records. Other artists like Shepp Dawg, Twizzy and new talents like Travis Jules and Grapes Johnson were also featured on a few singles.

At the end of it all The Mecca released 73 songs, 6 music videos, a two part cd compilation, a digital book and 3 mixtapes namely: Alienated, Initial Contact and Rated F to cap it off. Kingz And Monsters then followed in June 2012. In that same year he was nominated for the Most Outstanding Youth in the Performing Arts Award at the National Youth Awards in his homeland St. Lucia.

Then another mixtape was brought forth the following year - The Mecca's EDM centered mixtape Futha Muckin' Pop Star. Released in January 2013 Futha Muckin Pop Star is an embodiment of fist-pumping, dance-floor thumping tracks with border crossing duets and pop culture commentary. Consisting of 13 electronic dance music songs, the mixtape touches on various topics ranging from partying and lust to relationships and everyday living, all brought to life with uncanny imagery and witty lyricism.

2014 - Present 
Since the culmination of Mecca Mondays, The Mecca has had noted success in the music industry. In 2014 his single ZOOM ZOOM was featured in numerous workout DVD's as well as VH1's "Single Ladies" and Fox's "Red Band Society,” and then featured again in "Chasing Life" on ABC Family in 2015 and Netflix's "Fuller House" in 2016. His single FLAT STOMACH was the premiere single at the 2014 Labo Ethnik Fashion & Lifestyle week in Paris.

References

Living people
Saint Lucian male singers
People from Laborie Quarter
Male pop singers
20th-century male singers
21st-century male singers
1983 births